A tetrasaccharide is a carbohydrate which gives upon hydrolysis four molecules of the same or different monosaccharides. For example, stachyose upon hydrolysis gives one molecule each of glucose and fructose and two molecules of galactose. The general formula of a tetrasaccharide is typically C24H42O21.

References